Yüksel Coşkunyürek (born 15 March 1965) is a Turkish politician who has been Deputy Minister of Transport, Maritime and Communication since December 2015. He served as a Member of Parliament for Bolu as a member of the Justice and Development Party (AKP) between 2002 and 2011.

References 

1965 births
Living people
Justice and Development Party (Turkey) politicians
Members of the 22nd Parliament of Turkey
Members of the 23rd Parliament of Turkey
Turkish Sunni Muslims
Deputy ministers of Turkey
Deputies of Bolu
People from Gerede